Mike Saenz (born 3 December 1959) is an American comic book artist and software designer. He is the creator of Shatter, as well as an early adult video game, MacPlaymate.  Saenz was also the founder of Reactor Inc., a defunct interactive game company.

Biography

Saenz was born in Chicago, Illinois. As the founder and CEO of Reactor, Inc., he developed and published interactive entertainment on CD-ROM. Reactor produced Spaceship Warlock, Virtual Valerie, Virtual Valerie 2, Virtual Valerie: The Director's Cut, and Donna Matrix.

The comic book Shatter was written by Peter Gillis and illustrated on the computer by Saenz. It was initially drawn on a first-generation Macintosh using a mouse, and printed on a dot-matrix printer. It was then photographed like a piece of traditionally drawn black-and-white comic art, and the color separations were applied in the traditional manner of the period.

After a brief career as a professional comic book artist for hire, he went solo and continued to innovate in the fields of comics as well as computers. He developed ComicWorks, the first computer program for creating comics. He later went on to develop Iron Man: Crash (Marvel Comics, 1988). In 1993, Saenz created Donna Matrix, a computer-generated graphic novel with 3-D graphics, published by Reactor Press.

Saenz created the cover for Chicago punk band Naked Raygun's first album Throb Throb.

References 

Sources
Lambiek

External links

  (archived)
A Conversation With Mike Saenz
Sex in Computer Games Part 2: Explicit Sex Sex In Computer Games

Living people
1959 births
American comics artists
American video game designers
Album-cover and concert-poster artists